This is a list of equipment used by the Afghan Armed Forces.

Infantry weapons

Anti-tank

Uniform

Armored fighting vehicles

Unarmored vehicles

Artillery

Aircraft

Fixed wing

Helicopters 

In addition, some seven Boeing Vertol CH-46 Sea Knights, previously used by the United States Department of State were rendered unusable and left behind by departing the United States forces in August 2021 following the fall of Kabul. On 10 June Afghan government said They now have over 50 aircraft available, because of "professional staff and in-house engineers", said Enayatullah Kharazmi, spokesman for the Ministry of Defense

References 

Lists of military equipment
Islamic Emirate Forces
Equipment